Douglas Foster may refer to:

 Douglas A. Foster (born 1952), professor of church history
 Douglas Eads Foster (1875–1962), councillor in Los Angeles, California